The Fantasia class is a class of cruise ships, operated by MSC Cruises. MSC Divina and MSC Preziosa are modified Fantasia-class ships.

The lead ship, MSC Fantasia, was completed in December 2008 and is the namesake of the class. The second ship, MSC Splendida, followed in March 2009. The third ship, MSC Divina entered service in May 2012 while the fourth and final ship, MSC Preziosa entered service in March 2013.

Overview
At the time of their construction the Fantasia class were the largest ships in the fleet of MSC Cruises, and were preceded by the much smaller Musica class, which are at 93,300 tons. The ships are designed to complement the previous Musica class.

 and  have a  spa facility, four swimming pools, a Tex-Mex restaurant, a 1,700-seater showlounge, a mini golf course, a tennis/basketball court. They also have 1,637 passenger cabins.

 and  have 1,751 staterooms, 114 more than the previous ships. They also have two additional elevators and their decks and restaurants are redesigned to allocate more space per passenger.

Phoenicia/MSC Preziosa
On June 4, 2010 a letter of intent was signed between STX France and Libyan state-owned company General National Maritime Transport Corporation (GNMTC), to build one cruise ship similar to MSC Fantasia, and MSC Splendida. Nominally named Phoenicia she was specified by Hannibal Gaddafi, who had a 120-ton shark aquarium integrated into the design. During construction, the Libyan Civil War broke out on 15 February 2011. In June 2011, STX France cancelled the contract, and began looking for a new buyer of the hull. It was announced on March 13, 2012, that MSC reached an agreement to buy the ship for 550 million euros, and be named MSC Preziosa.

Ships

Data
 Gross tonnage: 138,000-139,000-GT
 Length: 
 Beam: 
 Draught: 
 Cost: $550 million

References

External links
 MSC Fantasia cruise ship from MSC Cruises

MSC Fantasia-class Cruise Ship
MSC Cruises